Detective vs Sleuths is a 2022 Hong Kong action thriller film directed by Wai Ka-fai and starring Sean Lau, Charlene Choi and Raymond Lam.  The film follows a former police with mentally disorder (Lau), who allied with elite inspector (Choi), involves into a series of murders which connected to their past cases they've once inspected, which they have to race against time to find out the truth and the mastermind behind the murders.

Originally announced in 2018, the film marks Wai's return to direct since the 2009 film Written By, and reunion with frequent collaborator/actor Lau. The film was released in Hong Kong on 21 July 2022, after a postponed period due to COVID closure of Hong Kong and China theatres. The film has received mixed reviews.

Premise
Jun Lee (Lau), a former police chief inspector and elite detective in OCTB who has been expelled from the police force, after his serious mental breakdown and ensured a chaos happened in police headquarters due to a wrongly conviction of the Butcher case and the Devil Cop case.

Years later, a series of high profile murders happens, and a group of culprits who called themselves "The Sleuths" leaving the sneak peeks of their next murders, which connected to the cases which Jun has investigated into. Yee Chan (Choi), a fellow lieutenant inspector in OCTB, who also the only survivor in the Butcher case 17 years ago, believes Jun is the only hope to crack the Sleuths, requests his help. The deeper they investigate of the Sleuths' motive of crime, they discover the secrets of the past cases beyond their imagination.

Cast
Sean Lau as Jun Lee, a former police chief inspector and detective in OCTB who was expelled after experiencing hallucinations.
Charlene Choi as Yee Chan, an senior inspector, who is also the only survivor in the Butcher case, After killed Fong Lai Shun before got promoted to chief inspector in OCTB
Raymond Lam as Fong Lai Shun, an chief inspector in OCTB, but he is actually a corrupted cop and the head of "The Sleuths" organisation. The real murderer of the Butcher Case and the Devil Cop Case. He was shot dead by Yee Chan at the coming end of the movie
Carman Lee as Yan Wong, Jun Lee's old colleague, Yee Chan, Fong Lai Shun and AuYeung Kim superior
Tan Kai as AuYeung Kim, an superintendent in OCTB, was caught and threatened by "The Sleuths" organisation to admit he is the real murderer of the Butcher Case and the Devil Cop Case
Carlos Chan as Tsai Ka Chu, an OCTB senior inspector, but actually is a member of "The Sleuths" organisation. Chun Chi To's son. Yeung Lai's boyfriend. At last he was shot dead by Fong Lai Shun
Kathy Yuen as Yeung Lai, an OCTB senior inspector, but actually is a member of "The Sleuths" organisation. Keung's daughter. TSai ka Chu's girlfriend. At last she was shot dead by Fong Lai Shun
Jeana Ho as Lynn Cheung, Jun Lee's rebellious daughter, action commander of "The Sleuths" organisation. At last she was shot dead by Fong Lai Shun
Deep Ng as Chun Chi To, a deceased from the Devil Cop Case
Timmy Hung as Keung, a deceased from the Butcher Case
Stephanie Che as Fishmonger, one of the murderers of the Corpse Cooking Case, she was at last murdered by "The Chosen Sleuths" organisation

Reception

Box office
Detective vs Sleuths has grossed a total of US$107.4 million worldwide combining its box office gross from Hong Kong (US$1,906,153), and China (US$105.5 million).

In Hong Kong, the film grossed HK$5,224,908 (US$645,603) during its first four days of release, debuting at No. 2. The film remained at No. 2 in its second weekend, grossing HK$5,318,944 and accumulating a total gross of HK$10,543,852 (US$1,343,166) by then. During its third weekend, the film grossed HK$2,999,499, moving down to No. 4, and have grossed a total of HK$13,543,351 (US$1,725,290) by then. On its fourth weekend, the film grossed HK$1,396,127, coming in at No. 7, accumulating a total gross of HK$14,939,478 (US$1,906,153) so far. Announced on August 15, 2022, the box office exceeded HK$15,000,000.

Critical reception 
Edmund Lee of South China Morning Post gave the film three stars out of five, and writes "its relentless parade of shoot-outs and explosions also make this quite an exhausting watch".

Notes

References

External links

 
 

2022 films
2022 action thriller films
Hong Kong action thriller films
Hong Kong crime thriller films
2020s Cantonese-language films
Emperor Motion Pictures films
Films directed by Wai Ka-Fai
Films with screenplays by Wai Ka-fai
Films about psychiatry
Films set in Hong Kong
Films shot in Hong Kong